Walter Willson Cobbett   (11 July 184722 January 1937) was an English businessman and amateur violinist, and editor/author of Cobbett's Cyclopedic Survey of Chamber Music. He also endowed the Cobbett Medal for services to chamber music.

Walter Cobbett was born in 1847 in Blackheath, England. He became an active supporter of music, and commissioned numerous works of chamber music from emerging and leading British composers of his time, including chamber works by Benjamin Britten, Frank Bridge, Ralph Vaughan Williams, Arnold Bax, and Eugene Goossens.

His two-volume encyclopedia of chamber music, published in 1929, is still considered the most comprehensive work on the subject today.  His insightful, wry and occasionally caustic style makes for enlightening and delightful reading.

An innovative industrialist and astute businessman, Cobbett was cofounder of Scandinavia Belting Ltd (today BBA Aviation Ltd.), which manufactured a new type of woven belting for machinery.

But Cobbett's heart was in music. "It has been humorously remarked that he has given to commerce what time he could spare from music," said an article in a contemporary edition of Groves Dictionary of Music and Musicians. Cobbett played weekly in a number of amateur string quartets, was concertmaster of two amateur orchestras, and was a prolific writer and publicist for chamber music.

In 1905, Cobbett endowed a competition, under the auspices of the Worshipful Company of Musicians, for chamber music composers.  The Cobbett Competition was instrumental in advancing the careers of leading composers of the time. In this first competition Frank Bridge won a Special Prize of £10 for his Phantasie String Quartet; to clarify past inaccuracies published widely about the names of the other winners of this competition, the following information is taken from the Court Minute Books of the Worshipful Company. First: William Hurlstone (£50 prize). Second: Haydn Wood (£10). Special Prize: Frank Bridge (£10). Three Extra Prizes: James Friskin, Harry Waldo Warner and Josef Holbrooke (£5.5.00) each. Other winners in later years included Benjamin Britten and Ralph Vaughan Williams. In addition to granting prizes, Cobbett commissioned works from these and other composers.

Cobbett established other prizes as well.  In 1920 he started granting annual prizes for chamber music performance for students of the Royal Academy of Music.  The Cobbett Medal for services to chamber music was established in 1924 - the first recipient was Thomas Dunhill - and continues to be awarded annually by the Worshipful Company of Musicians. He also encouraged British luthiers by granting prizes for outstanding instruments.

Cobbett started a periodical on Chamber music, called the Chamber Music Supplement.  He established a free library of chamber music and started chamber music concert series in working-class neighborhoods of British cities.

Cobbett's Cyclopedic Survey of Chamber Music was the result of four years of labor.  In addition to Cobbett's own extensive contributions, the two-volume survey includes articles by leading musicians and musicologists of the time, including Vincent d'Indy, Donald Tovey, Ralph Vaughan Williams and others.

Cobbett wrote of his own devotion to chamber music that "there opened out before me an enchanted world... I became a humble devotee of this infinitely beautiful art, and so began for me the chamber music life."

Cobbett died in London, England in 1937. His legacy is continued by the Cobbett Association, an organization devoted to rediscovering forgotten works of chamber music.

See also
Walter Willson Cobbett Medal

References

External links 
 Four Cobbett Prizes awarded to Frank Bridge (archive copy)
 The Cobbett Phantasy Prize 1905
 The Cobbett Phantasy Prize 1907
 Winners of the Cobbett Medal

English writers about music
1847 births
1937 deaths
Deaths from influenza
Commanders of the Order of the British Empire
People from Blackheath, London